In Du Toit v DPP, an important case in South African criminal procedure, certain of the accused applied for an order in terms of which

 the State would be bound to further particulars it had supplied as well as statements which the State had placed on record that full discovery of the case docket had taken place; and
 the State would be prohibited from using in the trial of the accused in any way, either directly or indirectly, documents which were handed to the defense after the commencement of the trial.

The court held that to say that the mere request for documents amounted to a request for further particulars which would bind the State if they were not provided immediately, was incorrect.

Thus the accused is not entitled to particulars regarding what the prosecution intends using as exhibits at the trial, and merely not including such evidence in the further particulars does not bar the State from presenting such documents.

Furthermore, the State could not be prohibited from presenting documents because they had limited themselves in an answer to a request for further particulars to only certain documents.

The court noted that even if the applicants' request were to be regarded as an application for further particulars, it would only have delimited the issues in dispute between those who requested the further particulars, namely the first three applicants, and the respondent. It was not clear how it could be said that it also bound the respondent with respect to the other accused who had not requested the further particulars.

Furthermore, it cannot be said that the investigation had to screech to a halt at the commencement of the trial and that further follow-up work could not be done. If a new document or witness came forward, the respondent would be entitled to make use thereof. The mere fact that a document was discovered later did not mean that it could be excluded on that ground alone.

Therefore, the application was totally premature and ill-founded and the application was refused.

South African criminal case law